David Lindsay may refer to:

Nobility
 David de Lindsay (died 1214), Anglo-Scottish baron of the early 13th century
 David Lindsay, 1st Earl of Crawford (c. 1360–1407), Scottish peer
 David Lindsay, 3rd Earl of Crawford (died 1446), regent to James II of Scotland
 David Lindsay, 8th Earl of Crawford (died 1542)
 David Lindsay, 9th Earl of Crawford (died 1558), Scottish peer and Member of Parliament
 David Lindsay, 10th Earl of Crawford (1527–1574), Earl of Crawford
 David Lindsay, 11th Earl of Crawford (c. 1547–1607), Scottish nobleman
 David Lindsay, 12th Earl of Crawford (1577–1620), Scottish nobleman
 David Lindsay, 27th Earl of Crawford (1871–1940), British Conservative politician and art connoisseur
 David Lindsay, 28th Earl of Crawford (1900–1975), also 11th Earl of Balcarres
 David Lindsay, 1st Duke of Montrose (1440–1495), Scottish nobleman
 David Lindsay, 2nd Lord Lindsay (died 1490), Scottish peers
 David Lyndsay (c. 1490 – c. 1555; alias Lindsay), Scottish herald
 David Lindsay, 1st Lord Balcarres (1587–1642), Scottish nobleman

Religion
 David Lindsay (bishop of Edinburgh) (1575–1641), also Bishop of Brechin
 David Lindsay (bishop of Ross) (1531–1613)

Sports
 David Lindsay (swimmer) (1906–1943), New Zealand swimmer
 David Lindsay (rugby union) (1906–1978), New Zealand rugby union player
 David Lindsay (footballer, born 1919) (1919–1987), Scottish footballer
 David Lindsay (English footballer) (born 1966), English former professional player
 David Lindsay (Scottish footballer), Scottish international player

Literature
 David Lindsay (novelist) (1876–1945), Scottish novelist, author of A Voyage to Arcturus
 David Lindsay-Abaire (born 1969), American playwright and lyricist
 Sir David Lyndsay or Lindsay (c. 1490 – c. 1555), Scottish Renaissance poet and playwright.

Other
 David Lindsay of Edzell, Lord Edzell (c. 1551–1610), Scottish judge, son of David Lindsay, 9th Earl of Crawford
 David Lindsay (explorer) (1856–1922), Australian explorer

See also
 David Lindley (disambiguation)
 David L. Lindsey (born 1944), American novelist
 David Lindsey (politician) (born 1931), member of the Florida House of Representatives
 Earl of Crawford